Catherine Hanrahan is a Canadian writer, whose debut novel Lost Girls and Love Hotels was a shortlisted finalist for the Rogers Writers' Trust Fiction Prize in 2007. The novel was based on her own experience living and working in Tokyo as an English teacher. She works now at Ies Enskede in Sweden as a teacher.

The novel was later optioned by Jean-Marc Vallée for adaptation as a feature film, which would have starred Kate Bosworth. The film was not made at that time, and it was not until 2017 that a new production was announced. Lost Girls & Love Hotels was written by Hanrahan, and directed by William Olsson.

References

21st-century Canadian novelists
21st-century Canadian women writers
Canadian women novelists
Living people
Year of birth missing (living people)